Yawhen Savastsyanaw (born 30 January 1988) is a Belarusian professional footballer who plays for Kluczevia Stargard.

External links

1988 births
Living people
Belarusian footballers
Association football midfielders
Belarusian expatriate footballers
Expatriate footballers in Poland
FC Neman Grodno players
FC Gomel players
FC Slutsk players
FC Dnyapro Mogilev players
FC Smorgon players